En la playa is a live acoustic CD/DVD by the Spanish pop rock band Hombres G, released on November 29, 2011.  It consists of a film and album and features collaborations with Dani Martín, Pereza, Miguel Bosé, Ana Torroja, Álvaro Urquijo, Albert Hammond, and Ha*Ash.  It includes live renditions of songs previously released by the group and features a new track called "Si seguimos así".

Background
According to David Summers, En la playa was based on the idea of making a film about a new experience: the creative companionship between artists in a beautiful setting.  The band wanted to make a live, acoustic, and refreshing record of a selection songs that meant something to Hombres G or to the guest artists.  With those intentions, Hombres G and their invited guests made their way towards Zahara de los Atunes, a small and quiet village located on Costa de la Luz in Andalusia, Spain.

In the album's press release, Summers emphasized that En la playa was not meant to be an album of duets or greatest hits.  He also noted that the natural sounds found on the DVD — those of the wind, the ocean, and the environment — could only go hand in hand with the scenic imagery of the beach.  Therefore, for the CD version, Hombres G headed to a studio in Madrid and added chords, keyboards, and songs.

Track listings
DVD

CD

References

External links
 Hombres-G.com
 Discography

2011 albums
Hombres G albums